Following the Armenian genocide, vorpahavak was the organized effort to "reclaim" women and children who had been abducted and forcibly converted to Islam during the genocide.

See also
Rape during the Armenian genocide
Forced religious conversion
Orphans of the Genocide

Sources

Armenian words and phrases
Aftermath of the Armenian genocide
Forced religious conversion
Armenian genocide survivors
Ethnic Armenian Muslims
Armenian nationalism
Genocidal rape